Potamotrygon is a genus of freshwater stingrays in the family Potamotrygonidae native to the rivers of South America, and sometimes seen in the aquarium trade.

Like other stingrays, the fishes of this genus have venomous barbs at the base of their tails, and their stings are dangerous to humans. It is said that the natives of South America fear the stingray more than they do fear the piranha.

In the aquarium
Though freshwater stingray of other genera do appear in the trade, most are from Potamotrygon. They are best kept with a deep, sandy substrate, in which they bury themselves, often with only the eyes visible. They are not territorial with other animals and can be kept in groups, provided a large enough aquarium is provided. They are carnivorous bottom feeders and require strong filtration as they are rather sensitive to water conditions. Many species of stingray have been bred in captivity and males can be determined by the presence of claspers as in other Chondrichthyans.

Species
There are currently more than 30 recognized extant (living) species in this genus:

 Potamotrygon adamastor Fontenelle, J. P. & de Carvalho, M. R., 2017 (Branco river stingray)
 Potamotrygon albimaculata M. R. de Carvalho, 2016 (Itaituba river stingray or Tapajós river stingray)
 Potamotrygon amandae Loboda & M. R. de Carvalho, 2013 (Amanda's river stingray)
 Potamotrygon amazona Fontenelle, J. P. & de Carvalho, M. R., 2017 (Upper Amazon raspy river stingray)
 Potamotrygon boesemani R. S. Rosa, M. R. de Carvalho & Wanderley, 2008 (Boeseman's river stingray) 
 Potamotrygon brachyura (Günther, 1880) (Short-tailed river stingray)
 Potamotrygon constellata (Vaillant, 1880) (Thorny river stingray)
 Potamotrygon falkneri Castex & Maciel, 1963 (Large-spot river stingray)
 Potamotrygon garmani Fontenelle, J. P. & de Carvalho, M. R., 2017 (Garman's river stingray)
 Potamotrygon henlei (Castelnau, 1855) (Big-tooth river stingray)
 Potamotrygon histrix (J. P. Müller & Henle, 1834) (Porcupine river stingray)
 Potamotrygon humerosa Garman, 1913 (Rough-back river stingray)
 Potamotrygon jabuti M. R. de Carvalho, 2016 (Pearl river stingray)
 Potamotrygon leopoldi Castex & Castello, 1970 (White-blotched river stingray)
 Potamotrygon limai Fontenelle, J. P. C. B. Silva & M. R. de Carvalho, 2014 (Zé Lima river stingray)
 Potamotrygon magdalenae (A. H. A. Duméril, 1865) (Magdalena river stingray)
 Potamotrygon marinae Deynat, 2006 (Marina's river stingray)
 Potamotrygon marquesi Silva & Loboda, 2019
 Potamotrygon motoro (J. P. Müller & Henle, 1841) (Ocellate river stingray)
 Potamotrygon ocellata (Engelhardt, 1912) (Red-blotched river stingray)
 Potamotrygon orbignyi (Castelnau, 1855) (Smooth-back river stingray)
 Potamotrygon pantanensis Loboda & M. R. de Carvalho, 2013 (Pantanal river stingray)
 Potamotrygon rex M. R. de Carvalho, 2016 (Great river stingray)
 Potamotrygon schroederi Fernández-Yépez, 1958 (Flower ray or rosette river stingray)
 Potamotrygon schuhmacheri Castex, 1964 (Parana river stingray)
 Potamotrygon scobina Garman, 1913 (Raspy river stingray)
 Potamotrygon signata Garman, 1913 (Parnaiba river stingray)
 Potamotrygon tatianae J. P. C. B. Silva & M. R. de Carvalho, 2011 (Tatiana's river stingray)
 Potamotrygon tigrina M. R. de Carvalho, Sabaj Pérez & Lovejoy, 2011 (Tiger river stingray)
 Potamotrygon wallacei M. R. de Carvalho, R. S. Rosa & M. L. G. Araújo, 2016 (Cururu ray)
 Potamotrygon yepezi Castex & Castello, 1970 (Maracaibo river stingray)

Extinct (fossil) species
Three species are extinct and only known from Tertiary fossil remains:

†Potamotrygon canaanorum
†Potamotrygon contamanensis
†Potamotrygon rajachloeae

References

 
Freshwater fish genera
Ray genera
Taxa named by Samuel Garman